Zavadilia is a genus of leaf beetles in the subfamily Eumolpinae. It is known from Madagascar.

Species
 Zavadilia magnifica (Baly, 1877)
 Zavadilia major Bechyné, 1946

References

Eumolpinae
Chrysomelidae genera
Beetles of Africa
Insects of Madagascar
Endemic fauna of Madagascar